The Security of Illusion is the ninth studio album by Saga, originally released in 1993. The album marks the return of keyboardist Jim Gilmour and drummer Steve Negus, both of whom left the band in 1986 due to management concerns.

Track listing
All lyrics and music written by Saga

Personnel

 Michael Sadler – vocals
 Ian Crichton – guitar
 Jim Gilmour – keyboards, vocals
 Jim Crichton – bass
 Steve Negus –  drums, percussion

Production

 Produced by Saga
 Mixed by Shay Baby
 Recording Engineer (Keyboards) – Steve Negus
 Recording Engineer (Guitars) – Ian Crichton
 Recording Engineer (All other instruments) – Jim Crichton

References

1993 albums
Saga (band) albums